Urano Navarrini, also known as Urano Benigni (2 May 1945 – 18 April 2020) was an Italian professional football player and manager.

Early and personal life
Born in Verona, Navarrini was the illegitimate son of Nuto Navarrini, and was known as Urano Benigni until recognised by his father in 1972.

Career
Navarrini played as a winger for Grunland Milanese Libertas, AC Milan, Pistoiese, Savona, Taranto, Verbania, Novara and Pro Patria.

After retiring he managed a number of Italian clubs, including Pro Patria, Aosta, and Vigevano.

Later life and death
He died in Milan on 18 April 2020, aged 74, from coronavirus.

References

1945 births
2020 deaths
Italian footballers
U.S. Pistoiese 1921 players
A.C. Milan players
Savona F.B.C. players
Taranto F.C. 1927 players
S.S. Verbania Calcio players
Novara F.C. players
Aurora Pro Patria 1919 players
Serie A players
Serie B players
Serie C players
Association football wingers
Italian football managers
A.S.D. Sorrento managers
Deaths from the COVID-19 pandemic in Lombardy
Footballers from Verona
Vigevano Calcio managers